Caryl Heller is a set decorator. She was nominated for an Academy Award in the category Best Art Direction for the film The Prince of Tides.

Selected filmography
 The Prince of Tides (1991)

References

External links

Year of birth missing (living people)
Possibly living people
Set decorators